This list of atheist Armenians includes ethnic Armenian atheists, including those of partial Armenian ancestry from the widespread diaspora. The native Armenian word for "atheist" is "godless" (classical , reformed spelling: անաստված, anastvats).

List

A
Ervand Abrahamian (b. 1940), an Iranian-Armenian historian of Iran. He wrote in the preface of one of his books that, "as far as religious conviction is concerned, [I am] an agnostic on most days - on other days, an atheist."
Victor Ambartsumian (1908-1996), Soviet Armenian astrophysicist
Bob Avakian (b. 1943), American communist, chairman of Revolutionary Communist Party, USA. Author of Away With All Gods!.

B
Ara Baliozian (1936-2019), Armenian author and critic
Levon Barseghyan (b. 1967), journalist, editor of Gyumri-based Asparez newspaper
Peter Boghossian (b. 1966), American philosopher, atheist activist

D
Karen Demirchyan (1932-1999), Soviet Armenian leader
Armen Dzhigarkhanyan (1935-2020), Armenian and Russian (formerly Soviet) film and theater actor and director. He has called himself a "realist" in one interview.

G
Kalust Gosdantian (1840-1898), Armenian philosopher
Levon Grigoryan (b. 1942), Armenian director and screenwriter

I
Torgom Isayan (1923-1987), historian of philosophy

K
Kamo (1882-1922), Armenian Bolshevik revolutionary
Ana Kasparian (b. 1986), American political commentator (self-described atheist)
Madatia Karakashian (1818-1903), Ottoman Armenian historian, former cleric
Jack Kevorkian (1928-2011), American euthanasia proponent (self-described as agnostic)
Aram Khachaturian (1903-1978), Soviet Armenian composer (self-described)
</ref> In his autobiography, Kocharyan wrote that despite having been baptized in 1996, he never became a believer.

M
Yervand Manaryan (1924-2020), Armenian actor. Self-described atheist.
Ned Markosian, American philosopher. Self-described atheist.
Hrach Martirosyan (b. 1964), Armenian linguist. Self-described atheist.
Monte Melkonian (1957-1993), Armenian left-wing nationalist revolutionary, militant and commander.
Anastas Mikoyan (1895-1978), Soviet Armenian revolutionary and statesman. Self-described atheist.
Edvard Mirzoyan (1921-2012), Armenian composer. Self-described atheist.
Khachik Momjian (1909-1996), Soviet philosopher
Armen Movsisyan (b. 1964), Armenian singer-songwriter. Self-described atheist.

N
Mikayel Nalbandian (1829-1866), Armenian anti-clerical writer and poet. He was described as an atheist by Soviet-era sources and contemporary clergy such as Gabriel Aivazovsky (1812-1879) Modern scholars describe him as a deist and a liberal Christian.
Sevan Nişanyan (b. 1956), Turkish-Armenian intellectual and linguist

S
Sergey Sargsyan (b. 1982), Armenian comedian
Ruben Sevak (1886-1915), Armenian writer
Andy Serkis (b. 1964), English actor
Marietta Shaginyan (1888-1982), Soviet writer
Stepan Shaumian (1878-1918), Bolshevik revolutionary

T
Nikolay Tsaturyan (b. 1945), Armenian theater director, self-described atheist
Arsen Torosyan (b. 1982), former Minister of Health of Armenia

See more
Lists of atheists
List of atheist Americans

References

Armenians
Atheist